A special delegation (délégation spéciale in French) in a municipal organization is a delegation of several members appointed by a representative of the state following the dissolution or resignation of a municipal council or another organization to perform the functions of mayor or president. The powers of a special delegation are limited to acts of pure administration and emergency management.

References 

French administrative law
Constitutional law